Clade is a phylogenetic group.

Clade may also refer to:

 Clade (novel), 2003 science fiction novel by Mark Budz
 Emil Clade, Luftwaffe flying ace in World War II

See also
 Cladistics
 Cladogram
 Subclade (disambiguation)
Grade (biology), often contrasted with clade
 Taxon